Plectroglyphidodon phoenixensis, also known as the phoenix damsel, is a species of Perciformes in the family Pomacentridae.

Description 
They have a total of 12 dorsal spines, 16-17 dorsal soft rays, 2 anal spines, and 13-14 anal soft rays. They grow to a maximum length of 9 centimetres (3.5 in).

Distribution 
The phoenix damsel is found in the Indo-Pacific region from East Africa through Marquesas Islands, Society Islands and Tuamotus, and north to Ryukyu Islands.

Habitat and biology 
The phoenix damsel is found in surge zone of seaward reef margins, and generally occurs in or near Acropora or Pocillopora coral patches. They are demersal; i.e. they occupy the sea floors. They are solitary and territorial. They are herbivores and live off benthic algae. Phoenix damsels are oviparous. They lay eggs which are demersal and adhere to the substrate, and the male guards and aerates them.

Conservation 
Their status on the IUCN Red List of Threatened Species has not yet been evaluated.

References 

phoenixensis
Animals described in 1943